The Commander of the Navy is the professional head of the Sri Lanka Navy. The current Commander of the Navy is Vice Admiral Priyantha Perera. It is a position equivalent to that of First Sea Lord of the Royal Navy or Chief of Naval Operations in the United States Navy.

By convention, serving Navy commanders have a rank of Vice Admiral, and will be promoted to the rank of Admiral on retirement or if appointed as Chief of Defence Staff (CDS).

History
The post of Captain of the Navy was created through the Navy Act of 9 December 1950, which also established the Royal Ceylon Navy.

In 1972, the "Dominion of Ceylon" became the "Democratic Socialist Republic of Sri Lanka" and the Royal Ceylon Navy was renamed the Sri Lanka Navy. The title "Captain of the Navy" was changed to "Commander of the Navy" through the Navy (Amendment) Law, No. 33 of 1976 in keeping with the terminology adopted by the other two services.

Official Residence
The official residences of the Commander of the Navy is the Navy House in Colombo, formerly the Navy House in Trincomalee.

List of Commanders (including Commanders of the Royal Ceylon Navy)

See also
Sri Lanka Navy
Navy House, Colombo
Navy House, Trincomalee
Commander of the Army
Commander of the Air Force

References

External links
Sri Lanka Navy

 
Sri Lanka Navy
 
N
Sri Lanka
Lists of Sri Lankan military personnel